The 2011 Kogi State gubernatorial election was the 5th gubernatorial election of Kogi State, Nigeria. Held on December 3, 2011, the People's Democratic Party nominee Idris Wada won the election, defeating Abubakar Audu of the Action Congress of Nigeria.

Results 
A total of 19 candidates contested in the election. Idris Wada from the People's Democratic Party won the election, defeating Abubakar Audu from the Action Congress of Nigeria.

References 

Kogi State gubernatorial elections
Kogi gubernatorial
April 2011 events in Nigeria